Virginia Ramey Mollenkott, (January 28, 1932 - September 25, 2020) best known for her "God of the Breasts" interpretation of El Shaddai, spent her 44-year professional career teaching college level English literature and language, but developed specializations in feminist theology and lesbian, gay, bisexual and transgender theology during the second half of that career.

Personal life 
Virginia May Ramey (birth name) was born in Philadelphia's Temple University Hospital on January 28, 1932 to Frank and May (Lotz) Ramey. She married Frederick H. Mollenkott on June 17, 1954, with whom she had a son, Paul F. Mollenkott, on July 3, 1958. The Mollenkotts divorced in July 1973. 

A Democrat and trans-religious scholar, Mollenkott lived with her domestic partner Judith Suzannah Tilton at Cedar Crest Retirement Village until Judith's death in February 2018; together they co-grandmothered Mollenkott's three granddaughters.

Ramey and Tilton got married in 2013 following the United States Supreme Court decision in United States v. Windsor, which overturned a law that denied federal benefits to same-sex couples. Ms. Tilton died in 2018.

Education 
She earned her B.A. from fundamentalist Bob Jones University in 1953, her M.A. at Temple University in 1955, and her Ph.D. at New York University in 1964. She received an honorary Doctorate in Ministries from Samaritan College in 1989.

Career 
She chaired the English Department at Shelton College, Ringwood, New Jersey from 1955 to 1963 and at Nyack College from 1963 to 1967. She then taught at William Paterson University from 1967 to 1997, chairing the English Department from 1972 to 1976. Since 1997 she has held the position of Professor of English Emeritus.

Mollenkott served as an assistant editor of Seventeenth Century News from 1965 to 1975, and as a stylistic consultant for the New International Version of the Bible for the American Bible Society from 1970 to 1978. She became an associate of the Women's Institute for Freedom of the Press (WIFP) in 1977. WIFP is an American nonprofit publishing organization which works to increase communication between women and connect the public with forms of women-based media. She also was a member of the translation committee for An Inclusive Language Lectionary for the National Council of Churches from 1980 to 1988. From 1980 to 1990, she was on the Board of Pacem in Terris, Warwick, New York. From 1989 through 1994, Mollenkott served on the Board of the Upper Room AIDS Ministry, Harlem, New York. For over a decade she was on the Board of Kirkridge Retreat and Conference Center, Bangor, Pennsylvania, starting in 1980. She held a seat on the Advisory Board of the Program on Gender and Society at the Rochester (New York) Divinity School from 1993 to 1996. She has been a manuscript evaluator for the Journal of Feminist Studies in Religion since 1994. She worked as a contributing editor to The Witness from 1994 to 2000. Since 1997 she has served on the editorial board of Studies in Theology and Sexuality, based in the United Kingdom. She was a contributing editor to The Other Side from 2003 to 2007.

She has delivered hundreds of guest lectures on feminist and LGBT theologies at churches, conferences, universities and seminaries throughout the United States.

Writing 
Mollenkott's books are listed below.
 Adamant and Stone Chips, 1967
 In Search of Balance, 1969
 Women, Men and the Bible, 1977 (revised 1988)
 Speech, Silence, Action: The Cycle of Faith 1980
 Is the Homosexual My Neighbor: A Positive Christian Response, 1978 (revised 1994) co-authored with Letha Dawson Scanzoni
 The Divine Feminine: Biblical Imagery of God as Female, 1983 (reprinted 2014)
 Views from the Intersection, 1984 (with Catherine Barry)
 Godding; Human Responsibility and the Bible, 1987
 Sensuous Spirituality: Out from Fundamentalism, 1982 (revised 2008)
 Omnigender: A Trans-Religious Approach, 2001 (revised 2007)
 Transgender Journeys, 2003 (reprinted 2010), co-authored with Vanessa Sheridan
 Fourth chapter of Transforming the Faiths of our Fathers: Women who Changed American Religion (2004), edited by Ann Braude.
 Gender Diversity and Christian Community (2005)

She is a lifetime member of the Modern Language Association, where she served on the Executive Committee of Religion and Literature from 1976 to 1980. She is also a lifetime member of the Milton Society of America, serving on the executive committee from 1974 to 1976. She has published dozens of articles in scholarly and literary journals as well as church-related publications, and is an active founding member of the Evangelical and Ecumenical Women's Caucus, better known as Christian Feminism Today.

Mollenkott's archives are available at The Center for Gay and Lesbian Studies at the Pacific School of Religion.

Editing 
Mollenkott edited a book of spiritual poems, Adam Among the Television Trees (1971) and a volume of inter-religious essays by Jewish, Christian, and Muslim women, Women of Faith in Dialogue (1987).

Awards
In 1992 Mollenkott received the New Jersey Lesbian and Gay Achievement Award, and in 1999 received a Lifetime Achievement Award from SAGE (Senior Action in a Gay Environment).

She has also won awards for her writing. Is the Homosexual My Neighbor: A Positive Christian Response won the Integrity Award in 1979. In 2002, her book Omnigender: A Trans-Religious Approach won the Lambda Literary Award for Bisexual/Transgender Literature and the Ben Franklin Award.

See also
Christian feminism
Christian egalitarianism
Christian views about women
Homosexuality and Christianity

References

External links
Mollenkott's official website
Profile and biography on LGBT Religious Archives Network

Christian feminist theologians
1932 births
2020 deaths
LGBT Christians
American feminists
Lesbian feminists
Bob Jones University alumni
Temple University alumni
New York University alumni
American LGBT writers
Lambda Literary Award winners
Lesbian academics
LGBT people from Pennsylvania